Steve Nimmons,  FRI FIMIS, is an Information Technologist and industry commentator. He is regular contributor to the technology press, and serves on a number of industry and political panels. He writes and speaks about Social computing, Enterprise Architecture and Open Innovation and is a member of the Atos Scientific Community

Education
He graduated from Ballymena Academy in 1988, and from the University of Ulster in 1993 with an honours degree in Computing and Diploma in Industrial Studies (DIS).

Professional credentials
A notable contributor in disciplines including IT, Engineering, Antiquaries, Natural History and The Arts as a:

 Certified European Engineer (Eur Ing)
 Chartered Engineer (CEng)
 Chartered Fellow of the British Computer Society (FBCS CITP)
 Fellow of the Institution of Engineering and Technology
 Fellow of the Institute for the Management of Information Systems (FIMIS)
 Fellow of the Institution of Analysts and Programmers (FIAP)
 Fellow of the Royal Society of Arts (FRSA)
 Fellow of the Linnean Society of London (FLS)
 Fellow of the Society of Antiquaries of Scotland (FSA Scot)
 Fellow of the Royal Institution (FRI).

Honours and awards
 Grand Officer of the Order of the Eagle of Georgia
 Commissioned Kentucky Colonel, 2009
 Humanitarian Silver Medal, Mongolian Red Cross Society, 2008
 Honorary "Tar Heel" (Honorary Citizen of North Carolina), 2010

Political interests

Nimmons is a member of the Conservative Party and Ulster Unionist Party and has active political interests across the United Kingdom and the Middle East. He is a member of the Conservative Technology Forum, Conservative Friends of Israel, is Community Relations Director at Anglican Friends of Israel and writes for The Times of Israel.

City of London
Active in the Livery movement and traditions of the City of London:

 Freeman of London
 Member of the Guild of Freemen of the City of London
 Juror of the Court Leet of the Guildable Manor of Southwark
 Freeman, Worshipful Company of Information Technologists
 Member, City Livery Yacht Club

Charity and philanthropic interests
He is the Northern Ireland Special Advisor to The Anne Frank Trust (UK), is a member of the Chairman's Circle of the Council of Christians and Jews, the Honorable Order of Kentucky Colonels, and the Rotary Club of London,.

Notes

References
Gloucester Citizen, Twitter abuse and internet trolls
Chartered Management Institute, Speedy internet infrastructure: contrasting views
British Computer Society, ISPs 'must be aware' of local concerns when rolling out superfast broadband
Press Association, Action urged to curb web abuse
Business Intelligence Gold Panning, British Computer Society, November 2008
What to do with Legacy COBOL, British Computer Society, February 2009
SOA – The Architecture with Nine Lives, British Computer Society, May 2009
Cloud Cover, Public Service Review, July 2010

External links

 Steve Nimmons' Website
 Steve Nimmons' Blog
 Pictures of Steve Nimmons

1970 births
Living people
People from Ballymena
Alumni of Ulster University
Fellows of the British Computer Society
Fellows of the Institution of Engineering and Technology
Fellows of the Society of Antiquaries of Scotland